Beijing North Star Company Limited is a state-owned conglomerate enterprise in Beijing, China. It is engaged in property management, property development and retailing. It was established in 1997. Its H shares were listed on the Hong Kong Stock Exchange in 1997 and its A shares were listed on the Shanghai Stock Exchange in 2006.

References

External links
 

Companies listed on the Hong Kong Stock Exchange
Companies listed on the Shanghai Stock Exchange
Companies based in Beijing
Companies established in 1997
Conglomerate companies of China
Government-owned companies of China
H shares